Aristocracy is Ali Project's fifth studio album, released on April 25, 2001.

Track listing

References

Ali Project albums
2001 albums
Tokuma Shoten albums